Nokrek National Park, the core area of Nokrek Biosphere Reserve, is a national park located approximately 2 km away from Tura Peak in West Garo Hills district of Meghalaya, India. UNESCO added the Nokrek Biosphere Reserve to its list of Biosphere Reserves in May 2009. Along with the Balpakram National Park in South Garo Hills, Nokrek is a hotspot of biodiversity in Meghalaya. Established in 1986, the National Park area comprising around 47.48 square kilometres is looked after by the Northern Nokrek and the Southern Nokrek Ranges of the Meghalaya State Forest Department under the administrative control of the Government of Meghalaya, India.

Fauna and flora 
The Nokrek region has a remnant population of the red panda that has generated curiosity across the world, one of which was accidentally shot by Dr J. Lao in 1960s. However apart from that lone sighting, there has never been any more sightings of the red panda in recent years. The Nokrek area is also an important habitat of the Asian elephant. The park had eight species of cats, ranging from the Royal Bengal tiger to marbled cat, but the current status of the first is uncertain.

There are seven species of primates in Nokrek. The rare stump-tailed macaque is frequently seen near the main trek to the peak. The pig-tailed macaque also occurs.  The Western Hoolock gibbon are common and their calls could be heard all over Nokrek.

The Nokrek region is also an Important Bird Area.

There is a vast range of plants found in the park. A huge canopy of thick, tall and lush green forests cover Nokrek and its environment. The mother germoplasm of Citrus indica (locally known as Memang Narang) have been discovered by science researchers within Nokrek Range. This discovery led to the establishment of the National Citrus Gene Sanctuary-cum-Biosphere Reserve covering an area of forty-seven square kilometres. The area has wild varieties of citrus fruits that provide a gene-pool for commercially produced citrus.

Geography 
The entire Biosphere Reserve is hilly. The rock is mainly gneisses, granulites, migmatites, amphibolites and banded iron formation, intruded by basis and ultra-basic bodies. In most of the Biosphere Reserve area, the soil is red loam. But sometimes it varies from clayey to sandy loam. The soils in the Biosphere Reserve are rich in organic matter and nitrogen, but deficient in phosphate and potash. The area consists of patchy sedimentary rock composed of pebble bed, sandstone, and carbonaceous shales.

All important rivers and streams of the Garo Hills region rise from the Nokrek Range, of which the river Simsang, known as Someshwari when it emerges into Bangladesh at Baghmara, is the most prominent.

Notable sites 
Notable sites in the park include the Nokrek Peak, Nokrek A'pal and the Matcha Nokpante ( meeting places of tiger). Chandigre Rural Tourism Resort is 9 Kms away from Nokrek Gate. Several waterfalls like Wachi Dare and Simsang Dare is located near the Nokrek National Park. Daribokgre village is the last village on the way to Nokrek and it is the Base Camp for many travelers, Researchers and Tourists.

Tourist Lodges & Homestays 
1. Balkasin Homestay / Bambitpa's Homestay
2. A'chik Heritage Pursuit's Cottage
3. Daribokgre Nokachik
4. Daribokgre Helipad Campsite
4. Sakal Aduma Nokachik
and others

See also 
 Indian Council of Forestry Research and Education

References

Further reading 
 Management Action Plan of Nokrek National Park for 2012-13 to 2016-17 published by the Divisional Forest Officer, East & West Garo Hills Wildlife Division, Tura

External links 
 "Protected Area Gazette Notification Database (Meghalaya)"
 
 WebIndia123 - National parks of Meghalaya

National parks in Meghalaya
Biosphere reserves of India
West Garo Hills district
1986 establishments in Meghalaya
Protected areas established in 1986